The Association of Women Clerks and Secretaries (AWCS) was a British trade union from 1912 to 1941.

History
The union formed in 1903 as the Association of Shorthand Writers and Typists and changed its name in 1912 to AWCS. It grew, partly because of World War I, from fewer than 900 members in 1916 to around 8000 in 1920.  It became a member of the Trades Union Congress in 1919.

Anne Godwin joined the union in 1920 and became its main organizer in 1928.

In 1941 AWCS merged with the National Union of Clerks and Administrative Workers to form the Clerical and Administrative Workers Union.

General Secretaries
1911: Florence
1916: Mabel Basnett
1918: Dorothy Evans
1931: Anne Godwin

Archives 
Records of the AWCS are kept in the London Metropolitan University's Trades Union Congress Library Collections.

References

Further research 
 Arthur Marsh; Victoria Ryan. 1997. The Clerks: a history of APEX, 1890-1989. Malthouse P.
 Historical Directory of Trade Unions, vol 1, pg. 46

Defunct trade unions of the United Kingdom
Clerical trade unions
Trade unions established in 1903
Trade unions disestablished in 1941